The 2008–09 Chicago Blackhawks season was the 83rd season for the National Hockey League franchise that was established on September 25, 1926.  Prior to the start of the season, the Blackhawks announced that 20-year-old center Jonathan Toews would serve as the team's captain for the 2008–09 season, thus making him the 3rd-youngest player to earn that distinction in the NHL. Their regular season began on October 10, 2008, against the New York Rangers and concluded on April 12, 2009, against the rival Detroit Red Wings. The Blackhawks played in the Winter Classic, an outdoor game, against the Red Wings at Wrigley Field on January 1, 2009. The team succeeded in making the 2008–09 playoffs with a 3–1 win over Nashville on April 3 after missing the 2007–08 playoffs by three points.

Pre-season

The Chicago Blackhawks had a busy offseason following the 2007–08 regular season. In late April, a few weeks after the season concluded, the Blackhawks announced that they were entering a three-year partnership with WGN (720 AM); they previously aired games on WSCR (670 AM). This coincided with a previous announcement that the team would air up to twenty games on WGN's TV affiliate. The club also brought back announcer Pat Foley to do the play-by-play announcing for all television broadcasts.

The Blackhawks made a "huge splash" on the first day of free agency by signing defenseman Brian Campbell and goaltender Cristobal Huet. Campbell's $57.12 million contract was the largest in team history. Along with Campbell and Huet, the Blackhawks signed three other free agents, while losing three to other teams. Long-time Detroit Red Wings coach Scotty Bowman joined the organization in late July as Senior Advisor of Hockey Operations. The Hawks also added Rockford IceHogs head coach Mike Haviland as an assistant coach, and signed former Colorado Avalanche coach Joel Quenneville as a scout.

On July 16, 2008, the NHL announced that the Blackhawks would host the second outdoor NHL Winter Classic on January 1, 2009, at Wrigley Field against the rival Detroit Red Wings. The game will be the 701st meeting between the two clubs, and the Blackhawks will wear uniforms similar to those they wore during the 1936–37 season.

The team also announced that they intended to retire jersey number #3 in honor of defensemen Pierre Pilote and Keith Magnuson. Hockey Hall of Famer Pilote spent thirteen seasons with the Hawks, winning the James Norris Memorial Trophy as the NHL's best defenseman on three occasions. Magnuson accumulated over 1,400 penalty minutes in eleven years with the team. Magnuson was the president of the Blackhawks Alumni Association before he died in an automobile accident in 2003.

Season events

The Chicago Blackhawks opened the season against the New York Rangers at Madison Square Garden on October 10, 2008. After winning only one of their first four games, the Blackhawks fired head coach Denis Savard. Shortly afterwards, they promoted scout Joel Quenneville as his replacement. In 147 games as coach, Savard posted a 65–66–16 record.

In December, an anonymous Blackhawks fan submitted an email to Mike Ross of XM Radio's NHL Home Ice, which revealed that the team had interrupted their travel schedule to attend the wake of general manager Dale Tallon's father. The team voted to delay their flight to Chicago during a six-game road trip in order to travel to the wake, which was in Northern Canada. The team reached the wake on two buses, and surprised Tallon, who was unaware of the team's plans. Ross was shocked that no media outlets had initially reported the story, and commented, "Its amazing that such a good story can be found nowhere on the internet, and not even mentioned in the Chicago papers. Had one of the Blackhawks got into a fight and punched some drunken loser in a Toronto bar it would be plastered all over papers and the television." The story eventually garnered much attention from various media outlets in the following week, including ESPN, Yahoo! Sports and Deadspin. MSNBC's Keith Olbermann commended the team's actions, by naming them the "best persons in the world" for the week.

On December 28, 2008, the Blackhawks set a franchise record nine consecutive wins.

Division standings

Conference standings

Schedule and results

Legend:

Playoffs

For the first time since 2002, the Blackhawks qualify for the Stanley Cup Playoffs.
For the first time since 1996, the Blackhawks advanced to the Stanley Cup Semi-final.
For the first time since 1995 the Blackhawks advanced to the conference finals.

Player statistics

Skaters

Goaltenders

†Denotes player spent time with another team before joining Blackhawks. Stats reflect time with the Blackhawks only.
‡Traded mid-season
Bold/italics denotes franchise record

Awards and records

Milestones

Transactions

Trades

Free agents

Draft picks
The 2008 NHL Entry Draft was hosted at Scotiabank Place in Ottawa, Ontario on June 20 and 21. With the eleventh pick in the first round, the Blackhawks selected Kyle Beach from the Everett Silvertips of the Western Hockey League. The Blackhawks drafted seven players (five defensemen and two forwards) in five of the seven rounds. All of the prospects were returned to their junior or professional league by the end of training camp.

See also
2008–09 NHL season

External links
Chicago Blackhawks official site
Regular season statistics
Season schedule and results

References

Chicago Blackhawks seasons
Chicago Blackhawks season, 2008-09
Chicago
Chic
Chic